Waldersee is a hamlet in the province of Manitoba, Canada. There is a church, Christ Lutheran and cemetery belonging to the Evangelical Lutheran Church In Canada in the hamlet. The Big Grass river flows from north to south just to the west of the cemetery and church.

References  

Hamlets in Manitoba